Timothy John Soutar (born 25 February 1946) is an English retired footballer who made one appearance in the Football League for Brentford as an inside left. He went on to have a long career in non-League football and played until the age of 50.

Playing career

Brentford 
Soutar began his career as a youth at Fourth Division club Brentford in 1961. He made his only Football League appearance for the club in a 3–1 defeat to Hull City at Griffin Park on 28 April 1964. He played in Brentford's victorious 2–1 1965 London Challenge Cup final victory over Chelsea at Griffin Park. Soutar was released at the end of the 1965–66 season.

Non-League football 
Soutar dropped into non-League football and joined Southern League First Division club Ashford Town (Kent) in 1966. He went on to play for Gravesend & Northfleet, Salisbury, Dunstable Town, Staines Town, Walton & Hersham, Feltham and Hanwell Town.

Managerial and coaching career 
After Rob Williams departed Isthmian League Premier Division club Staines Town in October 1980, Soutar and Arthur Rowlands were appointed joint-caretaker managers until the appointment of George Talbot. In 1989, he returned to Brentford to coach in the club's Centre Of Excellence.

Honours 
Brentford
 London Challenge Cup: 1964–65

Career statistics

References

1946 births
Living people
Footballers from Oxford
English footballers
Association football inside forwards
Brentford F.C. players
Ashford United F.C. players
Ebbsfleet United F.C. players
Salisbury City F.C. players
English Football League players
Dunstable Town F.C. players
Staines Town F.C. players
Walton & Hersham F.C. players
Feltham F.C. (1946) players
Hanwell Town F.C. players
Staines Town F.C. managers
Isthmian League players
Southern Football League players
Isthmian League managers
Brentford F.C. non-playing staff
English football managers